Jon Stewart (born 1962) is an American political satirist, writer, television host and stand-up comedian. 

Jon Stewart may also refer to:

 Jon Stewart (footballer) (born 1989), English footballer
 Jon Stewart (philosopher) (born 1961), American philosopher and historian of philosophy

See also

 John Stuart (disambiguation)
 John Stewart (disambiguation)
 Jonathan Stewart (born 1987), American football running back
 Jonathan Stewart (linebacker) (born 1990), American football linebacker